
Year 26 BC was either a common year starting on Tuesday or Wednesday or a leap year starting on Monday, Tuesday or Wednesday (link will display the full calendar) of the Julian calendar (the sources differ, see leap year error for further information) and a common year starting on Monday of the Proleptic Julian calendar. At the time, it was known as the Year of the Consulship of Augustus and Taurus (or, less frequently, year 728 Ab urbe condita). The denomination 26 BC for this year has been used since the early medieval period, when the Anno Domini calendar era became the prevalent method in Europe for naming years.

Events 
 By place 

 Roman Empire 
 Imperator Caesar Augustus becomes Roman Consul for the eighth time. His partner Titus Statilius Taurus becomes Consul for the second time and refounds the old Contestanian Iberian capital of Ilici (Elche), known since then as "Colonia Iulia Ilici Augusta".
 Cleopatra Selene marries Juba II of Numidia, and as a wedding present Augustus makes her the queen of Mauretania in her own right.
 Disastrous campaign of Aelius Gallus in the Arabian Peninsula, then known as "Arabia Felix".
 Tiridates II invades Parthia and issues coins dated from March and May, 26 BC.
 Gavius Silo, orator, is heard by Caesar Augustus - mentioned by Seneca.
 Augustus starts a campaign against the Cantabrians in northern Hispania. He leads an army (8 legions) and consolidates the north-eastern region.

 Greece 
 Dioteimus Alaieus is one of the Archons of Athens.

 Osroene 
 Abgar III of Osroene is succeeded by Abgar IV Sumaqa.

 Asia 
 The Andhra dynasty replaces the Kanva dynasty, and rules over the eastern part of India.

 By topic 

 Astronomy 
 August 29 – Christian Cross Asterism (astronomy) at Zenith of Lima, Peru.

Births

Deaths 
 Gaius Cornelius Gallus, Roman politician and poet (b. 70 BC)
 Marcus Valerius Messalla Rufus, Roman politician

References